The Hague Conventions of 1899 and 1907 are a series of international treaties and declarations negotiated at two international peace conferences at The Hague in the Netherlands. Along with the Geneva Conventions, the Hague Conventions were among the first formal statements of the laws of war and war crimes in the body of secular international law. A third conference was planned for 1914 and later rescheduled for 1915, but it did not take place because of the start of World War I.

History
The Hague Conventions of 1899 and 1907 were the first multilateral treaties that addressed the conduct of warfare and were largely based on the Lieber Code, which was signed and issued by US President Abraham Lincoln to the Union Forces of the United States on 24 April 1863, during the American Civil War. The Lieber Code was the first official comprehensive codified law that set out regulations for behavior in times of martial law; protection of civilians and civilian property and punishment of transgression; deserters, prisoners of war, hostages, and pillaging; partisans; spies; truces and prisoner exchange; parole of former rebel troops; the conditions of any armistice, and respect for human life; assassination and murder of soldiers or citizens in hostile territory; and the status of individuals engaged in a state of civil war against the government.

As such, the code was widely regarded as the best summary of the first customary laws and customs of war in the 19th century. It was welcomed and adopted by military establishments of other nations. The 1874 Brussels Declaration, which was never adopted by all major nations, listed 56 articles that drew inspiration from the Lieber Code. Much of the regulations in the Hague Conventions borrowed heavily from the Lieber Code.

Subject matter
Both conferences included negotiations concerning disarmament, the laws of war and war crimes. A major effort in both conferences was the creation of a binding international court for compulsory arbitration to settle international disputes, which was considered necessary to replace the institution of war. 

This effort failed at both conferences. Instead, a voluntary forum for arbitration, the Permanent Court of Arbitration, was established. Most of the countries present, including the United States, Great Britain, Russia, France, China and Persia, favoured a process for binding international arbitration, but the provision was vetoed by a few countries, led by Germany.

Hague Convention of 1899

The First Hague Conference came from a proposal on 24 August 1898 by Russian Tsar Nicholas II. Nicholas and Count Mikhail Nikolayevich Muravyov, his foreign minister, were instrumental in initiating the conference. The conference opened on 18 May 1899, the Tsar's birthday. The treaties, declarations, and final act of the conference were signed on 29 July of that year, and they entered into force on 4 September 1900. What is referred to as the Hague Convention of 1899 consisted of three main treaties and three additional declarations:
(I): Convention for the Pacific Settlement of International Disputes

This convention included the creation of the Permanent Court of Arbitration, which exists to this day. The section was ratified by all major powers and many smaller powers26 signatories in all, including Austria-Hungary, Belgium, Bulgaria, China, Denmark, Germany, France, Greece, Italy, Japan, Luxembourg, Mexico, Montenegro, the Netherlands, the Ottoman Empire, Persia, Portugal, Romania, Russia, Serbia, Siam, Spain, Sweden and Norway, Switzerland, the United Kingdom and the United States.

(II): Convention with respect to the Laws and Customs of War on Land

This voluminous convention contains the laws to be used in all wars on land between signatories. It specifies the treatment of prisoners of war, includes the provisions of the Geneva Convention of 1864 for the treatment of the wounded, and forbids the use of poisons, the killing of enemy combatants who have surrendered, looting of a town or place, and the attack or bombardment of undefended towns or habitations. Inhabitants of occupied territories may not be forced into military service against their own country and collective punishment is forbidden. The section was signed by all major powers listed above except China.

(III): Convention for the Adaptation to Maritime Warfare of the Principles of the Geneva Convention of 22 August 1864

This convention provides for the protection of marked hospital ships and requires them to treat the wounded and shipwrecked sailors of all belligerent parties. It too was ratified by all major powers.

(IV,1): Declaration concerning the Prohibition of the Discharge of Projectiles and Explosives from Balloons or by Other New Analogous Methods

This declaration provides that, for a period of five years, in any war between signatory powers, no projectiles or explosives would be launched from balloons, "or by other new methods of a similar nature". The declaration was ratified by all the major powers mentioned above, except the United Kingdom and the United States.

(IV,2): Declaration concerning the Prohibition of the Use of Projectiles with the Sole Object to Spread Asphyxiating Poisonous Gases

This declaration states that, in any war between signatory powers, the parties will abstain from using projectiles "the sole object of which is the diffusion of asphyxiating or deleterious gases". Ratified by all major powers, except the United States.

(IV,3): Declaration concerning the Prohibition of the Use of Bullets which can Easily Expand or Change their Form inside the Human Body such as Bullets with a Hard Covering which does not Completely Cover the Core, or containing Indentations

This declaration states that, in any war between signatory powers, the parties will abstain from using "bullets which expand or flatten easily in the human body". This directly banned soft-point bullets (which had a partial metal jacket and an exposed tip) and "cross-tipped" bullets (which had a cross-shaped incision in their tip to aid in expansion, nicknamed "dum dums" from the Dum Dum Arsenal in India). It was ratified by all major powers, except the United States.

Hague Convention of 1907

The Second Hague Conference, in 1907, resulted in conventions containing only few major advancements from the 1899 Convention. However, the meeting of major powers did prefigure later 20th-century attempts at international cooperation.

The second conference was called at the suggestion of U.S. President Theodore Roosevelt in 1904. It was postponed because of the war between Russia and Japan. The Second Peace Conference was held from 15 June to 18 October 1907. The intent of the conference was to expand upon the 1899 Hague Convention by modifying some parts and adding new topics; in particular, the 1907 conference had an increased focus on naval warfare. 

The British attempted to secure the limitation of armaments, but these efforts were defeated by the other powers, led by Germany, which feared a British attempt to stop the growth of the German fleet. As Britain had the world's largest navy, limits on naval expansion would preserve that dominant position. Germany also rejected proposals for compulsory arbitration. However, the conference did enlarge the machinery for voluntary arbitration and established conventions regulating the collection of debts, rules of war, and the rights and obligations of neutrals.

The treaties, declarations, and final act of the Second Conference were signed on 18 October 1907; they entered into force on 26 January 1910. The 1907 Convention consists of thirteen treaties—of which twelve were ratified and entered into force—and one declaration:
 (I): Convention for the Pacific Settlement of International DisputesThis convention confirms and expands on Convention (I) of 1899. As of February 2017, this convention is in force for 102 states, and 116 states have ratified one or both of the 1907 Convention (I) and the 1899 Convention (I), which together are the founding documents of the Permanent Court of Arbitration.
 (II): Convention respecting the Limitation of the Employment of Force for Recovery of Contract Debts
 (III): Convention relative to the Opening of HostilitiesThis convention sets out the accepted procedure for a state making a declaration of war.
 (IV): Convention respecting the Laws and Customs of War on LandThis convention confirms, with minor modifications, the provisions of Convention (II) of 1899. All major powers ratified it.
 (V): Convention relative to the Rights and Duties of Neutral Powers and Persons in case of War on Land
 (VI): Convention relative to the Legal Position of Enemy Merchant Ships at the Start of Hostilities
 (VII): Convention relative to the Conversion of Merchant Ships into War-ships
 (VIII): Convention relative to the Laying of Automatic Submarine Contact Mines
 (IX): Convention concerning Bombardment by Naval Forces in Time of War
 (X): Convention for the Adaptation to Maritime Warfare of the Principles of the Geneva Convention (of 6 July 1906)This convention updated Convention (III) of 1899 to reflect the amendments that had been made to the 1864 Geneva Convention. Convention (X) was ratified by all major states except Britain. It was subsequently superseded by Second Geneva Convention.
 (XI): Convention relative to Certain Restrictions with regard to the Exercise of the Right of Capture in Naval War
 (XII): Convention relative to the Establishment of an International Prize CourtThis convention would have established the International Prize Court for the resolution of conflicting claims relating to captured ships during wartime. It is the one convention that never came into force. It was ratified only by Nicaragua.
 (XIII): Convention concerning the Rights and Duties of Neutral Powers in Naval War
 (XIV): Declaration Prohibiting the Discharge of Projectiles and Explosives from BalloonsThis declaration extended the provisions of Declaration (IV,1) of 1899 to the close of the planned Third Peace Conference (which never took place). Among the major powers, this was ratified only by China, Britain, and the United States.

Participants

The Brazilian delegation was led by Ruy Barbosa, whose contributions are seen today by some analysts as essential for the defense of the principle of legal equality of nations. The British delegation included Sir Edward Fry, Sir Ernest Satow, the 11th Lord Reay (Donald James Mackay) and Sir Henry Howard as delegates, and Eyre Crowe as a technical delegate. The Russian delegation was led by Friedrich Martens. The Uruguayan delegation was led by José Batlle y Ordóñez, a defender of the idea of compulsory arbitration. 

With Louis Renault and Léon Bourgeois, Paul Henri d'Estournelles de Constant was a member of the French delegation for both the 1899 and 1907 delegations.  He later won the Nobel Peace Prize in 1909 for his efforts. The U.S. representative, with the rank of ambassador, was former American Bar Association president U. M. Rose. The representative of the Chinese Empire was Lu Zhengxiang, who would become Prime Minister of the Republic of China in 1912.

Though not negotiated in The Hague, the Geneva Protocol to the Hague Conventions is considered an addition to the Conventions. Signed on 17 June 1925 and entering into force on 8 February 1928, its single article permanently bans the use of all forms of chemical and biological warfare. The protocol grew out of the increasing public outcry against chemical warfare following the use of mustard gas and similar agents in World War I, and fears that chemical and biological warfare could lead to horrific consequences in any future war. The protocol has since been augmented by the Biological Weapons Convention (1972) and the Chemical Weapons Convention (1993).

Legacy

Many of the rules laid down at the Hague Conventions were violated in World War I. The German invasion of Belgium, for instance, was a violation of Convention (III) of 1907, which states that hostilities must not commence without explicit warning. Poison gas was introduced and used by all major belligerents throughout the war, in violation of the Declaration (IV, 2) of 1899 and Convention (IV) of 1907, which explicitly forbade the use of "poison or poisoned weapons".

Writing in 1918, the German international law scholar and neo-Kantian pacifist Walther Schücking called the assemblies the "international union of Hague conferences". Schücking saw the Hague conferences as a nucleus of a future international federation that was to meet at regular intervals to administer justice and develop international law procedures for the peaceful settlement of disputes, asserting that "a definite political union of the states of the world has been created with the First and Second Conferences".

After World War II, the judges of the military tribunal of the Trial of German Major War Criminals at Nuremberg Trials found that by 1939, the rules laid down in the 1907 Hague Convention were recognised by all civilised nations and were regarded as declaratory of the laws and customs of war. Under this post-war decision, a country did not have to have ratified the 1907 Hague Convention in order to be bound by them.

Although their contents have largely been superseded by other treaties, the Hague Conventions of 1899 and 1907 continue to stand as symbols of the need for restrictions on war and the desirability of avoiding it altogether. Since 2000, Convention (I) of 1907 on the Pacific Settlement of International Disputes has been ratified by 20 additional states.

See also
List of parties to the Hague Conventions of 1899 and 1907
American Peace Society
Antimilitarism
Command responsibility
Hague Secret Emissary Affair
Martens Clause
Militarism
Rule of Law in Armed Conflicts Project
Saint Petersburg Declaration of 1868 (Declaration Renouncing the Use, in Time of War, of Explosive Projectiles Under 400 Grammes Weight)
World Federation

References

Citations

Sources 

 Avalon Project at Yale Law School on The Laws of War—Contains the full texts of both the 1899 and 1907 conventions, among other treaties.
 ICRC International Humanitarian Law – Treaties & Documents, contains full texts and ratifying states of both the 1899 and 1907 conventions, among other treaties.
 List of signatory powers of the Convention for the Pacific Settlement of International Disputes
 The Hague conventions and declarations of 1899 and 1907, by James Brown Scott (ed.) Contains the texts of all conventions and the ratifying countries as of 1915.
 
 Lee, Jin Hyuck. The First Hague Peace Conference 1899 as portrayed in Punch
 
 
 
 Robinson, James J. (September 1960). "Surprise Attack: Crime at Pearl Harbor and Now". ABA Journal 46(9). American Bar Association. p. 978.

Further reading
 Baker, Betsy. "Hague Peace Conferences (1899 and 1907)." The Max Planck Encyclopedia of Public International Law, 4.2 (2009): 689–698. online
 Barcroft, Stephen. "The Hague Peace Conference of 1899". Irish Studies in International Affairs 1989, Vol. 3 Issue 1, pp 55–68. online
 Best, Geoffrey. "Peace conferences and the century of total war: the 1899 Hague Conference and what came after." International Affairs 75.3 (1999): 619–634. online
 Bettez, David J. "Unfulfilled Initiative: Disarmament Negotiations and the Hague Peace Conferences of 1899 and 1907". RUSI Journal: Royal United Services Institute for Defence Studies, June 1988, Vol. 133 Issue 3, pp 57–62.
 Eyffinger, Arthur. "A highly critical moment: role and record of the 1907 Hague Peace Conference." Netherlands international law review 54.2 (2007): 197–228.
 Hucker, Daniel. "British Peace Activism and 'New’Diplomacy: Revisiting the 1899 Hague Peace Conference." Diplomacy & Statecraft 26.3 (2015): 405–423. online
 Reinsch, P. (1908). "Failures and Successes at the Second Hague Conference." American Political Science Review, 2(2), 204–220.
Scott, James Brown, ed. The Hague Peace Conferences of 1899 and 1907, Vol. 1, The Conferences. (The Johns Hopkins Press 1909). online

External links

 Hague Peace Conventions 1899, Netherlands Ministry of Foreign Affairs (official depositary)
 Hague Peace Conventions 1907, Netherlands Ministry of Foreign Affairs (official depositary)

 
1899 in military history
1907 in military history
1899 in the Netherlands
1907 in the Netherlands
1908 conferences
1907 conferences
19th century in The Hague
20th century in The Hague
Diplomatic conferences in the Netherlands
International humanitarian law treaties
Pacifism in Germany
Peace conferences
Treaties establishing intergovernmental organizations
Treaties concluded in 1899
Treaties concluded in 1907
Treaties entered into force in 1900
Treaties entered into force in 1910
Treaties of Albania
Treaties of Argentina
Treaties of Australia
Treaties of Austria-Hungary
Treaties of the Bahamas
Treaties of Bahrain
Treaties of Bangladesh
Treaties of Belize
Treaties of Benin
Treaties of Burkina Faso
Treaties of the Byelorussian Soviet Socialist Republic
Treaties of Belgium
Treaties of Bolivia
Treaties of the First Brazilian Republic
Treaties of the Principality of Bulgaria
Treaties of the Kingdom of Cambodia (1953–1970)
Treaties of Cameroon
Treaties of Canada
Treaties of Chile
Treaties of the Qing dynasty
Treaties of the Republic of China (1912–1949)
Treaties of Colombia
Treaties of Costa Rica
Treaties of Croatia
Treaties of Cuba
Treaties of Cyprus
Treaties of Czechoslovakia
Treaties of the Czech Republic
Treaties of the Republic of the Congo (Léopoldville)
Treaties of Denmark
Treaties of Djibouti
Treaties of the Dominican Republic
Treaties of Ecuador
Treaties of Egypt
Treaties of El Salvador
Treaties of Eritrea
Treaties of Estonia
Treaties of Ethiopia
Treaties of the Ethiopian Empire
Treaties of Fiji
Treaties of Finland
Treaties of the French Third Republic
Treaties of Georgia (country)
Treaties of the German Empire
Treaties of the Kingdom of Greece
Treaties of Guatemala
Treaties of Guyana
Treaties of Haiti
Treaties of the Qajar dynasty
Treaties of Honduras
Treaties of Iceland
Treaties of India
Treaties of Ba'athist Iraq
Treaties of Ireland
Treaties of Israel
Treaties of the Kingdom of Italy (1861–1946)
Treaties of the Empire of Japan
Treaties of Jordan
Treaties of Kenya
Treaties of the Korean Empire
Treaties of South Korea
Treaties of Kuwait
Treaties of Kosovo
Treaties of Kyrgyzstan
Treaties of the Kingdom of Laos
Treaties of Latvia
Treaties of Lebanon
Treaties of Liberia
Treaties of the Libyan Arab Jamahiriya
Treaties of Liechtenstein
Treaties of Lithuania
Treaties of Luxembourg
Treaties of North Macedonia
Treaties of Madagascar
Treaties of Malaysia
Treaties of Malta
Treaties of Mauritius
Treaties of Mexico
Treaties of the Principality of Montenegro
Treaties of Morocco
Treaties of the Netherlands
Treaties of New Zealand
Treaties of Nicaragua
Treaties of Nigeria
Treaties of Norway
Treaties of the Ottoman Empire
Treaties of the Dominion of Pakistan
Treaties of the State of Palestine
Treaties of Panama
Treaties of Paraguay
Treaties of Peru
Treaties of the Philippines
Treaties of the Second Polish Republic
Treaties of the Kingdom of Portugal
Treaties of the Portuguese First Republic
Treaties of Qatar
Treaties of the Kingdom of Romania
Treaties of the Russian Empire
Treaties of Rwanda
Treaties of Saudi Arabia
Treaties of São Tomé and Príncipe
Treaties of Senegal
Treaties of the Kingdom of Serbia
Treaties of Serbia and Montenegro
Treaties of Singapore
Treaties of Slovakia
Treaties of Slovenia
Treaties of South Africa
Treaties of Spain under the Restoration
Treaties of the Dominion of Ceylon
Treaties of the Republic of the Sudan (1956–1969)
Treaties of Suriname
Treaties of Eswatini
Treaties of Sweden
Treaties of Switzerland
Treaties of Thailand
Treaties of Togo
Treaties of Uganda
Treaties of the Ukrainian Soviet Socialist Republic
Treaties of the United Arab Emirates
Treaties of the United Kingdom (1801–1922)
Treaties of the United Kingdoms of Sweden and Norway
Treaties of the United States
Treaties of Uruguay
Treaties of Venezuela
Treaties of Vietnam
Treaties of Zambia
Treaties of Zimbabwe